Pedro Carmelo Spadaro Philipps (born 16 May 1977) is a Peruvian lawyer and Fujimorist politician and a former Congressman, representing the Constitutional Province of Callao between 2011 and 2016. Spadaro is currently serving as Mayor of Ventanilla since 2019.

Biography 
In 2000 he graduated as a lawyer from the University of San Martín de Porres. He completed a specialization course in municipal management at the Lima Bar Association in 2001, and completed part of a master's degree at the University of Piura.

Political career

Early political career 
In the 2002 regional elections, he unsuccessfully ran for a position as councilor for the La Perla District for the La Perla Independent Movement. Between 2004 and 2006 he was general manager and advisor to the Callao regional presidency, when it was occupied by Rogelio Canches. In the legislative elections of 2006 and in those of 2010 he ran, in both cases without success, for the position of mayor of the Ventanilla District, at the first opportunity by the Movimiento Amplio Regional Callao (Mar Callao), a party founded and directed by Canches, and in the second by Mi Callao.

Congressman 
In the 2011 elections, he ran for a seat in Congress under the Force 2011 party of Keiko Fujimori, representing the Constitutional Province of Callao and was elected for the 2011–2016 term.

He has made several criticisms of Susana Villarán’s municipal management of Lima (2011-2014), claiming that state resources are being misused.

Mayor of Ventanilla 
In the municipal and regional elections held on October 7, 2018, he was elected mayor of Ventanilla by the "Fuerza Chalaca" Regional Movement, a movement created and chaired by Omar Marcos Arteaga.

References 

1977 births
Living people
Peruvian people of English descent
Fujimorista politicians
People from Lima
Members of the Congress of the Republic of Peru
21st-century Peruvian lawyers
University of San Martín de Porres alumni
People from Callao